Mubarak Khan Lashari  or more popular as Darya Khan Lashari , was a famous general of Samma Dynasty of Sindh, a powerful statesman and regent at the court of Samma ruler Jam Feroz According to other sources his original name was Qabooliyo and he was Sammo by caste, whose deeds of valour are sung all over Sindh to this day. Darya Khan was adopted son and prime minister of Jam Nizamuddin II who defeated the Argun army in the Battle of Jalwakhir near Bibi Nani in the Bolan Pass.This victory made Darya Khan Lashari, the 'Dollah' (Hero) of Sindh.On his deathbed, Jam Nizamuddin,entrusted to Darya Khan the care of his kingdom,of his treasures, his family, and his son Jam Feroz.Darya Khan was real son of land and icon of periotism who fought for the freedom of homeland till his death and martyred while fighting bravely in the Battle of Fatehpur when an arrow struck his throat on 21 December 1521 AD and thus ended the reign of Jam Feroz as an independent ruler.

Military service
In the days of Mongol, Sultan Hussain Mirza Baiqra, of Khurasan, on complaints of the merchants of Central Asia (Herat and Qandhar), that they were looted by Sir.dhis, the Sultan sent an armed expedition to Sind border, which after initial raids returned to their country. A declaration of victory was issued in Herat in 892 A.H. (1487 AD). It states that the infidels (Sindhis), aware of Mongol movements, collected a large army and wanted to make a surprise attack but the Islamic forces (Mongols) learned of it and made offensive attacks, killing many of these Hindus (forces of Jam Nizamuddin). As a result of this success declaration of victory was issued.

This may have been an attack on the Sindh border without any results. Amir Zul Noon Arghoon then was Herat's Naib at Qandhar. He seems to have despatched his son Shah Beg on this expedition. The latter captured the Sibi Fort from Jam Nizamuddin's agent Bahadur Khan and installed his brother Sultan Mohammad, who later on was defeated and killed by Mubarak Khan Lashari (Darya Khan Lashari Dullah) near Jalwagir in Bolan Pass, close to Bibi Nani.

After this incident, the Mongols did not turn up in Sindh during the life of Jam Nizamuddin. At that time, the Mongol troops had advanced as far as Chanduka, Sardecha, and Kot Machhi, but after being expelled by Darya Khan Lashari, they never turned back during Jam Nizamuddin's lifetime.

Death of Jam Nizamuddin Samma after 48 years rule of Sind and was succeeded by his son Nasiruddin Abul Fatah Feroz Shah-II. At that time Jam Feroz had neglected the affairs of the state, refused the advice of Darya Khan Lashari, who had to retire to his Jagir in the village Ghaha (Kahan near Sehwan and these failures brought his defeat at the hands of Salahuduin who thus became the ruler of Sind. Feroz Shah along with his mother Madina Machhani went over to Ghaha to Darya Khan Lashari, who at the request of Madina agreed to help, collected troops from Sehwan, but got the first setback at the hands of Haji, the Minister of Jam Salahuddin. As luck would have it the Minister's letter about the success of the initial battle addressed to Jam Salahuddin fell in the hands of Darya Khan Lashari, who had it replaced, conveying Salahuddin that the Minister's forces had been defeated and it was advisable for him to abandon Thatta. This was quickly done. Darya Khan Lashari then moved Feroz Shah to Thatta and installed him on 1st Shawwal, 918 A.H. (1512 A D. 12 October). Salahuddin then returned to Gujarat. He had remained in possession of Thatta for about eight months and must have collected a large sum of money from Thatta and organized another battle.

Last days of Darya Khan Lashari 
There are different versions of the last days of his life.

Tahiri states: 

Masumi on the other hand reports:
Beglar Nama states that:

Zafar-ul-Walih states:

Shrine of Darya Khan Lashari
An inscription at the north oi Mubarak Khan's grave calls him Al Khanul Azam Wa Shahid Mubarak Khan Ibn Sultan Nizamuddin.

References

15th-century Indian people
Mughal Empire people
History of Sindh

Sindhi people
1521 deaths
Year of birth unknown
Sindhi warriors